Selene setapinnis, the Atlantic moonfish, is a West Atlantic fish belonging to the family Carangidae.

Description 
The Atlantic moonfish is a slender, deep bodied fish that is extremely compressed. It has a dorsal fin with 8 spines, and an anal fin with 2 spines. They also have 21 dorsal soft rays and 17 anal soft rays. The upper jaw is short and lower jaw is protruding, extending longer than the upper jaw. They have a sloped, bent forehead and rather large eyes. They have a forked caudal fin that is attached to a large and hard caudal peduncle. The Atlantic moonfish have a faint spot on the base of their pectoral fins. They have a silvery or metallic blue color with a yellowish caudal fin. The dorsal and caudal peduncle regions are lined with a dark edging.

Diet 
Adults feed on small fish and crustaceans.

Habitat 
Atlantic moonfish can be found in schools at the bottoms of inshore waters. Juveniles can be found on muddy bottoms of brackish waters. Their depth range is 0–55 m, and they prefer subtropical regions.

Distribution 
Western Atlantic: Nova Scotia, Canada, along coasts of Gulf of Mexico and South America, Argentina. Replaced by Selene dorsalis in eastern Atlantic.

Naming and etymology 
Selene setapinnis was  formally described by the American ichthyologist Samuel L. Mitchill as Zeus setapinnis in 1815 with the type locality given as the Bay of New York, New York, U.S.A. The  generic name Selene is from the Greek for "moon", referring to the vague moon-shape of S. vomer while the specific name is a compound of seta meaning "bristle" and pinnis meaning "fin" and refers to the bristle-like points of the dorsal fin and the anal fin.

References 

 “Atlantic Moonfish – Selene Setapinnis.” The Jump. The Jump. 2016. Web. 1 May 2017.
 “Atlantic Moonfish.” Virginia Institute of Marine Science. VIMS, 2017. Web. 1 May 2017.
 Cervigón, F., 1993. Los peces marinos de Venezuela. Volume 2. Fundación Científica Los Roques, Caracas,Venezuela. 497 p. (Ref. 9626)
 "Inland Fishes of New York State". C. Lavett Smith.

setapinnis
Fish of the Eastern United States
Fish of the Western Atlantic
Fish described in 1815
Taxa named by Samuel L. Mitchill